Pardoxia is a genus of moths in the family Nolidae. The genus was erected by Antonio Vives Moreno and R. González Prada.

Species
Pardoxia dinarodes (Hampson, 1912) Yemen, Ethiopia, Kenya, Tanzania, Zaire
Pardoxia gephyrias (Meyrick, 1902) Aden, Somalia
Pardoxia graellsii (Feisthamel, 1837) southwestern Europe, Mauritania, Burkina Faso, Sierra Leone, the Gambia, Ghana, Nigeria, Equatorial Guinea, Zaire, Uganda, Malawi, Iraq, Arabia, Ethiopia, Zambia, Zimbabwe, South Africa, Namibia, Cape, Verde, Reunion, Comoros, Mauritius, Madagascar, Punjab

References

Chloephorinae
Moths of Europe
Moths of Asia
Moths of Africa